This is a list of known collectible card games. Unless otherwise noted, all dates listed are the North American release date.

This contains games backed by physical cards; computer game equivalents are generally called digital collectible card games and are catalogued at List of digital collectible card games.

List

{|class="wikitable sortable" width="850px" "font-size:90%"

! width=500px| Title
! width=50px| Year
! width=250px| Publisher
! width=50px| In Print?
|-
|.hack//Enemy||2003||Decipher, Inc.||No
|-
|007 Spy Cards  ||2008||GE Fabbri||No
|-
|24: Trading Card Game ||2007||Press Pass, Inc.||No
|-
|7th Sea ||1999||Alderac Entertainment Group||No
|-
|Adventure Time Card Wars||2014||Cryptozoic Entertainment||No
|-
|Afterworld ||2016|| Panini||No
|-
|Age of Empires II Expandable Card Game ||2000||Journeyman Press/The United States Playing Card Company||No
|-
|AGE: The Amazing Goal Era ||2009||RCS MediaGroup||No
|-
|Ah! My Goddess ||2009||Upper Deck||No
|-
|Air TCG ||2001||||No
|-
| Aldnoah Zero ||2015||Movic||No
|-
| Alice x Cross ||2008||Bushiroad||No
|-
|Alien Attax  ||2013||Topps||No
|-
| Aliens Predator Collectible Card Game||1997||Precedence Entertainment/HarperCollins/HarperPrism/Zehrapushu/ZI Games|| No
|-
|Allegiance: War of Factions||2004||Lucid Raven Productions||No
|-
|Álomfogók ||2007||Beholder Kft.||No
|-
|Alteil ||2004||?||No
|-
|American Idol Collectible Card Game ||2004||Fleer/SkyBox International||No
|-
|Animo ||2019||Animo Games||Yes
|-
|||2013||media Factory||No
|-
|Angelic Layer||?||Amada Printing/Clamp||No
|-
|Ani-Mayhem||1996||Pioneer Entertainment/Pioneer Animation||No
|-
|Animum Saxis ||?||Showmans||No
|-
|Aniołowie ||2005||Wydawnictwo Wieszcze||No
|-
|Aquarian Age ||2000||Broccoli||No
|-
|Arc the Lad Generation ||2004||Sony||No
|-
|Arcadia||1996||White Wolf Publishing||No
|-
|Arcadia Tribe ||2015||Kadokawa||No
|-
|Arcana Strikes ||1997||?||No
|-
|Arkna: Trading Card Game ||2010||IguanaBee||No
|-
|Asura System ||2004||Terranetz||No
|-
|Austin Powers Collectible Card Game||1999||Decipher, Inc.||No
|-
|Avatar: The Last Airbender Trading Card Game ||2006||Upper Deck||No
|-
|B B-daman' ||?||Takara||No
|-
|Babylon 5 Collectible Card Game ||1997||Precedence Entertainment||No
|-
|Bakugan: Battle Brawlers (Trading Card Game) ||2010||Giochi Preziosi||No
|-
|Banemaster: The Adventure ||1995||Chessex||No
|-
|Bankett!! ||?||?||No
|-
|Baseball 3010 ||2002||ImagiNation Sports, LLC.||No
|-
|Baseball Heroes ||2005||Konami||No
|-
|Bass Mania X ||?||Creek||No
|-
|Battle Spirits ||2009||Bandai||Yes
|-
|Battlelords||1995||New Millennium Entertainment||No
|-
|Battlestar Galactica Collectible Card Game||2006||WizKids||No
|-
|BattleTech||1996||Wizards of the Coast||No
|-
|Battlez ||2004||Illektron||No
|-
|Beast Clans ||2017||Beast Clans LLC||Yes
|-
|Behind ||2003||Fishtank||No
|-
|Bella Sara||2005||Hidden City Games/Conceptcard||No
|-
|Ben 10 ||2007||Bandai||No
|-
|Berserk ||2003||Fantasy World, Inc./Hobby World||Yes
|-
|Beyblade Collectible Card Game ||?||Takara||No
|-
|Beyblade Trading Card Game ||2003||Decipher, Inc.||No
|-
|Bible Battles Trading Card Game ||2008||Bible Battles Trading Card Game, LLC||Yes
|-
|Bionicle: Quest for the Masks ||2001||Upper Deck||No
|-
|Bleach Soul Card Battle ||2004||Bandai||No
|-
|Bleach Trading Card Game||2007||Score Entertainment||No
|-
|Blood Wars||1995||TSR||No
|-
|Bratz Fashion Party Fever Game ||2004||Upper Deck||No
|-
|Buffy the Vampire Slayer Collectible Card Game ||2001||Score Entertainment||No
|-
|Build Divide TCG
|2020
|Bandai Namco.
|Yes
|-
|Bumblings - The funtasy card game ||2014||Gernilex Bt.||No
|-
|C-23 ||1998||Wizards of the Coast||No
|-
|Call of Cthulhu: Collectible Card Game||2004||Fantasy Flight Games||No
|-
|Captain Tsubasa Trading Card Game ||2002||Konami||No
|-
|Cardcaptors Trading Card Game ||2001||Upper Deck||No
|-
|Cardfight!! Vanguard||2011||Bushiroad||Yes
|-
|Case Closed Trading Card Game||2005||Score Entertainment||No
|-
|The Caster Chronicles TCG ||2017||Force of Will Ltd.||Yes
|-
|Champions ||1995||F.X. Schmid/Gibsons Games||No
|-
|Chaos TCG ||?||Bushiroad||No
|-
|Chaotic Trading Card Game ||2007||4Kids Entertainment||No
|-
|City of Heroes Collectible Card Game||2005||AEG||No
|-
|Club Penguin Trading Cards||2008||Disney||No
|-
|Codename: Kids Next Door Trading Card Game ||2005||Wizards of the Coast||No
|-
|Combat Cards ||2006||self-published||No
|-
|Conan Collectible Card Game||2006||Comic Images/Tempo Games||No
|-
|Corunea ||2008||Insight Games||No
|-
|Cricket Attax ||2017||Topps||Yes
|-
|The Crow ||1995||Target Games/Heartbreaker Hobbies||No
|-
|Crystalicum: Kryształowa Gra Karciana ||2005||Wolf Fang P.H.||No
|-
|Cyberpunk The Collectible Card Game ||2003||Social Games/ImageNative Worlds, Inc./R. Talsorian Games, Inc.||No
|-
|||1997||Amada Printing||No
|-
|Dark Age||1996||FPG, Inc.||No
|-
|Dark Eden||1997||Target Games/Heartbreaker Hobbies||No
|-
|||1994||Schmidt Spiele||No
|-
|Dark Millennium||2005||Sabertooth Games||No
|-
|Deadlands: Lost Colony - Showdown ||2000||Pinnacle Entertainment Group||No
|-
|Death Note Trading Card Game ||2008||Konami||No
|-
|Devacurse Trading Card Game ||2007||Gandharvas Studio||No
|-
|Die Drachenjäger Sammelkartenspiel ||2006||Toggo||No
|-
|Digi-Battle ||2000||Bandai||No
|-
|||1999||Bandai||No
|-
|Digimon Card Game||2021||Bandai||Yes  
|-
|Digimon D-Tector ||2002||Bandai||No
|-
|Dimension 0 ||2005||Broccoli||No
|-
|Dinosaur King||2008||Upper Deck||No
|-
|Dixie||1994||Columbia Games||No
|-
|Doctor Who – Battles in Time ||2006||GE Fabbri||No
|-
|Doctor Who Monster Invasion||2011||BBC Worldwide||No
|-
|Doctor Who: The Collectible Trading Card Game||1996||M.M.G. Ltd.||No
|-
|Don: Continuing Criminal Enterprise ||2002||MythIntentions, LLC||No
|-
|||1999||Nintendo||No
|-
|Doomtrooper ||1995||Target Games||No
|-
|Doomtown||1998||Five Rings Publishing Group/Wizards of the Coast/AEG||No
|-
|The Dozens ||2005||Topps||No
|-
|Dragon Ball Collectible Card Game ||2008||Bandai||No
|-
|Dragon Ball Super Card Game ||2017||Bandai||Yes
|-
|Dragon Ball Z Collectible Card Game ||2005||Score Entertainment||No
|-
|Dragon Booster Trading Card Game||2004||Score Entertainment||No
|-
|Dragoborne: Rise to Supremacy 
|2017
|Bushiroad, Ltd.
|No
|-
|Dragon Dynasty Collectible Card Game ||2001||Romancing Cathay||No
|-
|Dragon Quest TCG ||2000||Enix/Tenky||No
|-
|The Dragon's Wrath ||1995||Naipes Heraclio Fournier||No
|-
|Draim Arena ||2007||Draim||No
|-
|Dredd: The Card Game ||2000||Round Table Productions||No
|-
|Duel Masters Trading Card Game||2004||Wizards of the Coast/Takara||Yes
|-
|Dune||1997||Last Unicorn Games/Five Rings Publishing Group/Wizards of the Coast||No
|-
|Eagles ||1995||Columbia Games||No
|-
|Echelons of Fire ||1995||Medallion Simulations||No
|-
|Echelons of Fury ||1995||Medallion Simulations||No
|-
|Election Quest Collectible Card Game ||2004||Bro! Novelties||No
|-
|Elementeo ||2009||Alchemist Empire||No
|-
|Epic Battles ||2005||Score Entertainment||No
|-
|Eve: The Second Genesis ||2006||CCP Games||No
|-
|Exodus The Trading Card Game ||2014||Existence Games||Yes
|-
|The Eye of Judgment ||2007||SCE Japan||No
|-
|Fantasy Adventures ||1996||Mayfair Games||No
|-
|Fastbreak ||1996||WildStorm Productions||No
|-
|FemWarriors ||2002||N Communications||No
|-
|Fight Klub ||2009||Decipher, Inc.||No
|-
|Final Fantasy Trading Card Game ||2011||Hobby Japan/Last Level/Square Enix/Neo Productions Unlimited||Yes
|-
|Final Twilight TCG ||2004||Neo Productions Unlimited||No
|-
|Final War Tactical Card Game ||2017||Games Lab||Yes
|-
|Fire Emblem 0 (Cipher)||2015||Nintendo/Intelligent Systems||Yes
|-
|Firestorm Tactical Card Game ||2001||Third World Games||No
|-
|Flesh & Blood ||2019||Legend Story Studios||Yes
|-
|Flights of Fantasy ||1994||Destini Productions Inc.||No
|-
|Football Champions ||2001||Wizards of the Coast||No
|-
|Football Resurrection ||2008||Portal Games Ltd.||No
|-
|Force of Will ||2012||Force of Will Ltd.||Yes
|-
|Fullmetal Alchemist: Alchemic Card Battle TCG ||2004||Bandai||No
|-
|Fullmetal Alchemist Trading Card Game ||2005||RC2 Inc./JoyRide Studios||No
|-
|Future Card Buddyfight||2013||Bushiroad||No
|-
|G.I. Joe Trading Card Game ||2004||Wizards of the Coast||No
|-
|Galactic Empires||1994||Companion Games||No
|-
|A Game of Thrones ||2002||Fantasy Flight Games||No
|-
|The Garbage Gang ||2008||Topps||No
|-
|Gasaraki Mission Director ||1999||Bandai||No
|-
|Geek Fight! ||2008||Diving Dragon Games||Yes
|-
|Generals Order ||2007||Strategy Entertainment||Yes
|-
|Gensō Suikoden Card Stories ||2001||Konami||No
|-
|Gridiron Fantasy Football||1995||Upper Deck||No
|-
|Guardians||1995||FPG, Inc.||No
|-
|Gundam Cross War ||2015||Bandai||No
|-
|Gundam M.S. War Trading Card Game ||2001||Bandai||No
|-
|Gundam War: Mobile Suit Gundam the Card Game ||2005||Bandai||No
|-
|Gundam War Nex-A ||2011||Bandai||No
|-
|Gwiezdna Kohorta (AKA: Stargate Kohorta)||2005||Wydawnictwo Imperium||No
|-
|Harry Potter Trading Card Game||2001||Wizards of the Coast||No
|-
|Hatalom Kártyái Kártyajáték (AKA Power Cards Card Game)||1995||Beholder Kft.||Yes
|-
|Hayate the Combat Butler TCG ||2009||Konami||No
|-
|Hecatomb||2005||Wizards of the Coast||No
|-
|Hercules: The Legendary Journeys ||1998||Wizards of the Coast||No
|-
|Heresy: Kingdom Come||1995||Last Unicorn Games||No
|-
|Hero Attax ||2016?||Topps||Yes
|-
|High Stakes Drifter ||2005||WizKids||No
|-
|Highlander: The Card Game||1995||Thunder Castle Games||No
|-
|Highlander: The Card Game 2nd Edition ||2006||Rapidpod||No
|-
|Horus Heresy ||2003||Sabertooth Games||No
|-
|Hot Wheels Acceleracers Collectible Card Game ||2005||Mattel||No
|-
|Humaliens Collectible Card Game ||2003||AEG||No
|-
|HumanKind ||2005||SALO||No
|-
|HunTik ||2009||Upper Deck||No
|-
|Hyborian Gates ||1995||CARDZ||No
|-
|Illuminati: New World Order||1994||Steve Jackson Games||No
|-
|Imajica||1997||Harper Prism/Clive Barker||No
|-
|Inazuma Eleven TCG||2004||Tomy||No
|-
|Initial D Collectible Card Game ||2003||AEG||No
|-
|Inuyasha Trading Card Game ||2004||Score Entertainment||No
|-
|James Bond 007 ||1995||Target Games/Heartbreaker Hobbies||No
|-
|Jedi Knights Trading Card Game ||2001||Decipher, Inc.||No
|-
|Jyhad (AKA Vampire: The Eternal Struggle)||1994||Wizards of the Coast/White Wolf Publishing, Inc./Black Chantry||Yes
|-
|Kabal|1995
|MultiSim
|No
|-
|Kaijudo||2012||Wizards of the Coast||No
|-
| ||1995||Alchemia||No
|-
|Kiba Trading Card Game ||2006||Upper Deck||No
|-
|Killer Instinct ||1996||Topps||No
|-
|Kingdom Hearts Trading Card Game || 2007||Fantasy Flight Games||No
|-
|Kiválasztottak, a M.A.G.U.S. kártyajáték ||1997||Valhalla Páholy Kft/CCG Art Kft/Két Mágus Kft/Delta Vision Kft||Yes
|-
|Knights of the Zodiac Collectible Card Game (AKA Saint Seiya in Japan)||2004||Bandai/Amada Printing||No
|-
|Kult ||1995||Target Games/Heartbreaker Hobbies||No
|-
|Langrisser ||1999||NCS||No
|-
|The Last Crusade||1995||Pinnacle Entertainment Group||No
|-
|||1999||Tea Ice Tokyo||No
|-
|Legend of the Burning Sands ||1998||Wizards of the Coast||No
|-
|Legend of the Five Rings ||1995||Five Rings Publishing Group/Wizards of the Coast/AEG||No
|-
|Lego: Ninjago Spinjitzu Card Game ||2016||Blue Ocean Entertainment/Burda Publishing Polska||No
|-
|Level Neo||2014||Movic||No
|-
|Lightseekers Trading Card Game ||2017||PlayFusion Ltd||Yes
|-
|Looney Tunes Trading Card Game ||2000||Wizards of the Coast||No
|-
|The Lord of the Rings Trading Card Game||2001||Decipher, Inc.||No
|-
|Love Live! School Idol Collection ||2016||Bushiroad||Yes
|-
|Luck & Logic ||2016||Bushiroad||No
|-
|Lycèe Trading Card Game ||2005||SilverBlitz||Yes
|-
|Magi-Nation Duel||2000||Interactive Imagination||No
|-
|Magic: The Gathering||1993||Wizards of the Coast||Yes
|-
|MapleStory Trading Card Game ||2007||Wizards of the Coast||No
|-
|Marvel Superstars ||2010||Upper Deck||No
|-
|Marvel Ultimate Battles ||2008||Upper Deck||No
|-
|Match Attax||2007||Topps||No
|-
|Medabots ||2002||Score Entertainment||No
|-
|MegaMan: NT Warrior Trading Card Game ||2004||Decipher, Inc.||No
|-
|Meta X  ||2017||Panini||No
|-
|MetaZoo
|2020
|MetaZoo Games LLC.
|Yes
|-
|Middle-earth Collectible Card Game||1995||Iron Crown Enterprises||No
|-
|Mighty Beanz Trading Card Game ||2004||Spin Master||No
|-
|The Mission ||2002||Ezekiel Limited||Yes
|-
|MLB Showdown||2000||Wizards of the Coast||No
|-
|Monster Collection ||1997||Group SNE||No
|-
|||1999||Tecmo||No
|-
|Monster Magic ||1995||Trio Toys||No
|-
|The Monster Maker Trading Card Game: Resurrection ||2001||Epoch||No
|-
|Monster Rancher Collectible Card Game ||2000||Artbox Entertainment||No
|-
|Monster Tykes ||2007||Rapid POD Printing||No
|-
|Monsuno ||2012||Topps||No
|-
|Monty Python and the Holy Grail Collectible Card Game ||1996||Kenzer & Company||No
|-
|Mortal Kombat Kard Game||1996||Brady Games||No
|-
|My Little Pony Collectible Card Game||2013||Enterplay||Yes
|-
|Mystical Empire ||2005||Northeast Games, Inc.||No
|-
|Mythos||1996||Chaosium||No
|-
|Myths and Legends||2000||Salo S.A / Klu||No
|-
|Naruto Collectible Card Game||2006||Bandai||No
|-
|NBA Adrenalyn XL||2010||Panini Games||No
|-
|NBA Showdown||2002||Wizards of the Coast||No
|-
|Neon Genesis Evangelion: The Card Game||1998||Bandai||No
|-
|Neopets Trading Card Game||2003||Wizards of the Coast||No
|-
|Nerve ||1999||Cell Entertainment AB||No
|-
|Netrunner||1996||Wizards of the Coast||No
|-
|NFL Adrenalyn XL||2010||Panini Games||No
|-
|NFL Showdown ||2002||Wizards of the Coast||No
|-
|The Nightmare Before Christmas Trading Card Game ||2005||NECA||No
|-
|Oligarchy ||2016||Entropic Games||No
|-
|On the Edge||1994||Atlas Games||No
|-
|One-On-One Hockey Challenge Collectible Card Game ||1997||Playoff Inc||No
|-
|One Piece Collectible Card Game||2003||Bandai||No
|-
|Ophidian 2350 ||2003||SkyBox International/Fleer||No
|-
|OverPower||1995||Fleer||No
|-
|Perry Rhodan Sammelkartenspiel ||1996||Fanpro/Between the Stars||No
|-
|Pez Card Game||2000||U.S. Games Systems||No
|-
|Pirates of the Caribbean Trading Card Game ||2006||Upper Deck||No
|-
|Pk cards ||2008||PKXL Cards, Inc.||No
|-
|Pokémon Trading Card Game ||1999||Wizards of the Coast/The Pokémon Company||Yes
|-
|Power Rangers Collectible Card Game ||2008||Bandai||No
|-
|PowerCardz ||1995||Caliber Games Systems||No
|-
|Precious Memories TCG ||2011?||Kadokawa||Yes
|-
|Prince of Tennis TCG ||2002||Konami||No
|-
|Prism Connect TCG ||2011||Ensky/Movic||No
|-
|Project: Utopia ||2009||Dragstarr Games||No
|-
|Queen's Blade: The Duel ||2008||Mega House||No
|-
|Quest for the Grail ||1995||Stone Ring Games/Horizon Games||No
|-
|QuickStrike||2006||Upper Deck||No
|-
|Racial Wars ||2012||Pentakl Publishing||No
|-
|Racing Challenge ||2000||Wizards of the Coast/White Wolf Publishing, Inc.||No
|-
|Rage||1995||White Wolf Publishing||No
|-
|Ragnarok: Dawn Of The Heavens' Massacre||2020||Drivethrucards||Yes
|-
|Rangers Strike Trading Card Game||2006||Bandai||No
|-
|RAVE Master! Trading Card Game ||2001||Konami||No
|-
|Raw Deal ||2000||Comic Images/WWE||No
|-
|Rawen TCG ||2013||Rawen Group Hungary||No
|-
|ReCharge ||2001||Marvel Enterprises, Inc.||No
|-
|Red Zone ||1995||Donruss||No
|-
|Redakai: Conquer the Kairu ||2011||Spin Master||No
|-
|Redemption ||1995||Cactus Game Design||Yes
|-
|RIFTS Collectible Card Game||2001||Precedence Entertainment/Palladium Books||No
|-
|Robotech Collectible Card Game ||2006||Hero Factory||No
|-
|RuinsWorld ||1995||Medallion Simulations||No
|-
|Ryvah Collectible Card Game ||2006||Ryvah||No
|-
|Sailor Moon Collectible Card Game||2000||Dart Flipcards||No
|-
|Scooby Doo Expandable Card Game ||2000||Journeyman Press||No
|-
|Shadowfist||1995||Daedalus Entertainment/Z-Man Games/Loch Ness Games, Inc./Inner Kingdom Games/Vetusta Games||Yes
|-
|Shadowrun: The Trading Card Game||1997||FASA/WizKids||No
|-
|Shaman King Trading Card Game ||2004||Upper Deck||No
|-
|Shin Sangoku Musou 4 Trading Card Game ||2005||Koei Co. Ltd.||No
|-
|Siegkrone TCG ||2013?||Gree||Yes
|-
|Sim City: The Card Game||1995||Mayfair Games||No
|-
|The Simpsons Sammelkartenspiel ||2001||Dino Entertainment/Panini||No
|-
|The Simpsons Trading Card Game ||2003||Wizards of the Coast||No
|-
|Sonic X Card Game ||2005||Score Entertainment||No
|-
|Spellfire||1994||TSR||No
|-
|The Spoils Card Game||2006||Arcane Tinmen||No
|-
|SpongeBob Squarepants Trading Card Game ||2003||Upper Deck||No
|-
|Spycraft Collectible Card Game ||2004||AEG||No
|-
|Star of the Guardians||1995||Mag Force 7||No
|-
|Star Quest ||1995||Comic Images||No
|-
|Star Sisterz||2003||Wizards of the Coast||No
|-
|Star Trek: The Card Game ||1996||Fleer/SkyBox International||No
|-
|Star Trek Customizable Card Game||1994||Decipher, Inc.||No
|-
|Star Trek Customizable Card Game Second Edition||2002||Decipher, Inc.||No
|-
|Star Wars Customizable Card Game||1995||Decipher, Inc.||No
|-
|Star Wars: Destiny ||2016||Fantasy Flight Games||No
|-
|Star Wars Trading Card Game||2002||Wizards of the Coast||No
|-
|Stargate Trading Card Game||2007||Comic Images||No
|-
|Stoked! Skateboarding Must Die ||2005||Sir Mantraplay||No
|-
|Street Proz ||2004||Game On Sports, Inc.||No
|-
|Street Warriors Collectible Card Game ||2005||Lethal Entertainment, Inc.||No
|-
|Super Deck! ||1994||Card Sharks, Inc.||No
|-
|Super Heat Skateboard Trading Card Game ||2011||Super Heat Games||No
|-
|||1996||Bandai||No
|-
|||1999||Bandai||No
|-
|Superior Defender Gundam Collectible Card Game ||2004||Bandai||No
|-
|The Supershow ||2014||SRG Universe Inc.||Yes
|-
|Survivor ||2002||Upper Deck||No
|-
|||1998||MediaWorks||No
|-
|Tank Commander ||1996||Moments in History||No
|-
|Techniconica ||2014||Stephen Bailey||No?
|-
|Teen Titans Collectible Card Game ||2005||Bandai||No
|-
|Teenage Mutant Ninja Turtles Trading Card Game |||2004||Upper Deck||No
|-
|Teenage Mutant Ninja Turtles Turtle Power ||?||Panini Games||No
|-
|Tempest of the Gods ||1995||Black Dragon Press||No
|-
|The Terminator ||2000||Precedence Entertainment/Tyranny Games/Zehrapushu/ZI Games||No
|-
|Terror ||1996||Kris Silver||No
|-
|Thorgal Kolekcjonerska Gra Karciana ||2002||Egmont Polksa||No
|-
|Timestream: The Remnant ||2002||Cahaba Productions Inc.||No
|-
|Tomb Raider Collectible Card Game ||1999||Precedence Entertainment||No
|-
|Top of the Order ||1995||Donruss||No
|-
|Towers in Time ||1995||Thunder Castle Games||No
|-
|Transformers ||2018||Wizards of the Coast||No
|-
|Trok ||2019||Trok TCG||Yes
|-
|||1997?||Enterbrain||No?
|-
|Ultimate Combat!||1995||Ultimate Games||No
|-
|Ultimate Muscle: The Kinnikuman Legacy Battle Card Game ||2003||Bandai||No
|-
|UniVersus (AKA Universal Fighting System)||2006||Sabertooth Games/Fantasy Flight Games/Jasco Games||Yes
|-
|Unlimited VS ||2014||SK Japan||No
|-
|Vampire: The Eternal Struggle (AKA Jyhad)||1995||Wizards of the Coast/White Wolf Publishing, Inc./Black Chantry||Yes
|-
|Vandaria Arkana ||2013?||Vandaria||No
|-
| ||2006||GameQuarters||No
|-
|Veto! ||2003||Krakowska Grupa Kreatywna||No
|-
|Vortium ||2014||Domo Sur SRL||Yes
|-
|Vrooom! ||1998||Ikon Games||No
|-
| VS System || 2004 || Upper Deck || No
|-
|Wakfu Trading Card Game||2011||Ankama Games/Upper Deck||No
|-
|Warcards ||2005||SC Patiart SRL||No
|-
|Warcardz ||2008||Warmoves Inc.||No
|-
|WarCry ||2003||Sabertooth Games||No
|-
|Warhammer 40,000 Collectible Card Game ||2001||Sabertooth Games||No
|-
| Warhammer Age of Sigmar: Champions || 2018 || PlayFusion Limited/Games Workshop || Yes
|-
|Warlord: Saga of the Storm ||2001||AEG/Phoenix Interactive||No
|-
|Warlords||1997||Iron Crown Enterprises||No
|-
|WARS Trading Card Game||2004||Decipher, Inc.||No
|-
|Wars of the Past ||2021||Finople Games/Finople Games||Yes
|-
|WCW Nitro ||2000||Wizards of the Coast||No
|-
|Weekly Shonen Sunday VS Weekly Shonen Magazine ||2008||Bushiroad||No
|-
|Weiß Schwarz ||2007||Bushiroad||Yes
|-
|The Wheel of Time||1999||Precedence Entertainment||No
|-
|WildStorms: The Expandable Super-Hero Card Game||1995||WildStorm Productions||No
|-
|Wing Commander Collectible Trading Card Game||1995||Mag Force 7||No
|-
|Winx Club Collectible Card Game ||2006||Rainbow Games/Upper Deck||No
|-
|Wixoss||2014||Tomy||Yes
|-
|Wizard in Training ||2000||Upper Deck||No
|-
|Wizards of Mickey ||2008||New Media Publishing||No
|-
|World of Warcraft Trading Card Game||2006||Upper Deck/Cryptozoic Entertainment||No
|-
|WWE Face Off ||2007||Topps||No
|-
|Wyvern||1995||U.S. Games Systems||No
|-
|The X-Files Collectible Card Game ||1996||Voyager Promotions||No
|-
|X-Men ||2000||Wizards of the Coast||No
|-
|X610Z existenz ||2009||Quantuum Magic||No
|-
|Xeko ||2005||Matter Group||No
|-
|Xena: Warrior Princess ||1998||Wizards of the Coast||No
|-
|Xiaolin Showdown Trading Card Game ||2005||Wizards of the Coast||No
|-
|XXXenophile||1996||Slag-Blah Entertainment/Studio Foglio||No
|-
|Young Jedi Collectible Card Game ||1999||Decipher, Inc.||No
|-
|Yu-Gi-Oh! Trading Card Game||2002||Konami||Yes
|-
|Yu Yu Hakusho Trading Card Game||2003||Score Entertainment||No
|-
|Zatch Bell! The Card Battle ||2005||Bandai||No
|-
|ZU Tiles: Hime||2020||ZU Studios, LLC||Yes
|-
|Z-G ||2001||Automoton||No
|-
|Z/X Zillions of enemy X||2013||Broccoli / Nippon Ichi Software||Yes
|-
|Gate Ruler
|2021
|Daiyu Inc.
|Yes
|}

Collectible common-deck card games
These card games are very similar to regular CCGs; however, they do not meet the strict definition, because all players use a shared deck, also known as a common deck, similar to Uno. There is little to no interest in collecting the cards.

Citadel Combat Cards (1992)
Dino Hunt (Steve Jackson Games) (1996)
Dragon Storm Game (Black Dragon Press) (1995)
Nuclear War (Flying Buffalo) (1965)

Non-collectible customizable card games
Sometimes referred to as Living Card Games, these games are very similar to CCGs but lack randomness to the purchase and distribution of the cards. Most are sold as complete sets and are therefore not collectible. Some of these games were meant to be traditional CCGs with booster packs, but the booster packs were never released.

 AdventureQuest Worlds The Anything-Goes BattleOn Battle Card Game (Artix Entertainment)
 Anachronism (TriKing Games/The History Channel)
 Android: Netrunner (Fantasy Flight Games) (2012)
 Anime Madness (Matthew Johnston Games) (1996)
 Arcmage: Rebirth (Arcmage Creative Commons Games) (2018) 
 Arkham Horror: The Card Game (Fantasy Flight Games) (2016)
 Ashes: Rise of the Phoenixborn (Plaid Hat Games) (2015) 
 Call of Cthulhu: The Card Game (Fantasy Flight Games) (2008)
 Calorie Kids (Ocean of Wisdom) (2000)
 Catan Card Game (1996) and its successor The Rivals for Catan (2010) can be played as a customizable card game with the “tournament rules”
 ChessHeads (WizerGames) (2004)
 Codex: Card-Time Strategy (Sirlin Games) (2016)
 Doomtown: Reloaded (Alderac Entertainment Group/Pine Box Entertainment)
 Elemental Clash (The Game Crafter/T.O.G. Entertainment) (2009)
 A Game of Thrones: The Card Game (Fantasy Flight Games) (2008)
 A Game of Thrones: The Card Game Second Edition (Fantasy Flight Games) (2015)
 Heavy Gear Fighter (Dream Pod 9) (1995)
 Horsepower: 5000 (self-published) (1995)
 Killer Bunnies and the Ultimate Odyssey
 Knightmare Chess (Steve Jackson Games) (1996)
 The Last Great War (The Outsiders Group) (1997)
 Legend of the Five Rings: The Card Game (Fantasy Flight Games) (2017)
 The Lord of the Rings: The Card Game (Fantasy Flight Games) (2011)
 Ophidian 2350 (Ophidian Games/Fleer) (2016)
 Shadowfist (2012) (re-styled in 2012 as a "Dynamic Card Game", with pre-constructed starter decks and non-randomized booster packs)
 Star Wars: The Card Game (Fantasy Flight Games) (2012)
 Star Wars Episode 1 CCG Boxed Set (Decipher, Inc.) (1999)
 Tribbles (Decipher, Inc.) (2000)
 Warhammer 40,000: Conquest (Fantasy Flight Games) (2014)
 Warhammer: Invasion (Fantasy Flight Games) (2009)
 Xi Cards (Xi Cards Ltd.) (2014) 

Notable non-collectible games
This is a catch-all category for those games that appear similar to CCGs but don't meet the strict definition in one way or another.

 Age of Heroes(Renegade Mage Games) (1997)
 The Base Ball Card Game (Allegheny) (1904)
 BattleCards (Merlin Publishing) (1993)
 Boy Crazy (Decipher, Inc.) (2000)
 Brawl (Cheapass Games) (1999)
 Chez Geek (Steve Jackson Games) (1999)
 Dark Mages (Bleem Divertissements Inc.) (2015)
 DragonElves (Fast Forward Entertainment) (2000)
 Emmerlaus: Duels of Mages (Creations Chaos) (1996)
 Express Chess (Black Box Entertainment) (1995)
 Fluxx (Looney Labs) (1996)
 Havic: The Bothering (PGI Limited) (1998)
 Illuminati (Steve Jackson Games) (1982)
 KeyForge (Fantasy Flight Games) (2018)
 Lost Worlds Fantasy Cards (1980)
 Mystick (Anoch Games Systems) (2000)
 Quest for the Faysylwood (Faysylwood Press) (1993)
 Rumble Robots (Trendmasters) (2000)
 Shadow Raven (Destiny Horizons, Inc.)
 Strat-O-Matic Baseball (1961'')
 Zoon (West End Games)

See also
 Collectible card game
 Digital collectible card game
 List of digital collectible card games

Notes

References

 
Lists of games